Joseph Nicholson was a public official from Maryland during the American Revolution. He was elected to the Second Continental Congress in 1777 but did not attend. He was married to Elizabeth Hopper; their son Joseph Hopper Nicholson became a U.S. congressman.

People of Maryland in the American Revolution
Year of birth missing
Year of death missing